Brooklyn is one of the southernmost neighborhoods in Baltimore, Maryland. It is located near Anne Arundel County along Governor Ritchie Highway which is also Maryland Route 2. Its main roads are South Hanover Street, (formerly First Street - before 1919), Potee Street, and East Patapsco Avenue, Sixth Street, Tenth Street, and West Bay Avenue which borders the neighboring Curtis Bay community to the east, running through Bay Brook Park, which separates the two. South Hanover Street also serves as the dividing line between east–west streets in Brooklyn, as Charles Street (which acts as the east–west divider from downtown north to the city line) does not exist here. Often mistaken as Brooklyn Park, Brooklyn shares the 21225 ZIP Code with the greater Brooklyn Park area which is across the Baltimore City Line (of the Annexation of 1919) in (northern Anne Arundel County) and the other neighboring community of Cherry Hill to the west and northwest across the now small western branch (formerly the old "Ferry Branch") of the Patapsco River flowing from Ellicott City and Elkridge and along the shoreline-hugging southern extension "South Hanover Street" of the downtown's old colonial-era "Hanover Street" (of the "Original Survey of 1729" of Baltimore Town) across the 1914-1917 Hanover Street Bridge, later renamed the Vietnam Veterans Memorial Bridge in the 1990s.

To the northeast, along the shoreline of the Patapsco River is the former residential communities of Fairfield and Wagner's Point (also known as East Brooklyn), which were "islands of houses" surrounded by the belt of river-front heavy industry. During the construction of the 1955-1957 Baltimore Harbor Tunnel of Interstate 895 (Maryland), another smaller residential island neighborhood of Masonville was purchased and razed by the highway construction.  Recently, its old name has been resurrected as the name of the nearby cove on the south shore of the river which has endured as a swampy forested "island of nature" and slated to be preserved amidst the nearby development of further port facilities for the Helen Delich Bentley Port of Baltimore. In the past decade these two communities of Fairfield and Wagner's Point have been also bought out and razed. Brooklyn is within the Baltimore City limits and Brooklyn Park and Brooklyn Heights along with smaller neighboring neighborhoods of Arundel Village, Arundel Gardens, Pumphrey, and Roland Terrace are in northern Anne Arundel County.

Brooklyn is the location of the John R. Hargrove, Sr. District Court Building, located right off of Patapsco Avenue. There is also a host of industry in the region, mainly shipping ports, rail yards, and oil tanks. Many car imports come through this area, as well as being the south end of the Harbor Tunnel that runs off I-895.

History

On 26 December 1911, King Johnson was lynched in Brooklyn. A mob was able to take him from his jail cell and shoot him four times. Nobody was ever tried for the killing.

The Brooklyn neighborhood was included in the areas annexed to the City of Baltimore in 1918 as a result of state legislation. Prior to the annexation, the neighborhood had been part of Anne Arundel County.

"On Jan. 3, 1941, with the world engulfed in a second global war and America on the precipice of entering the fray, President Franklin Roosevelt announced an emergency, $350-million shipbuilding program. The S.S. Patrick Henry, the first of these ships, was launched with great fanfare on Liberty Fleet Day in September 1941. Ultimately, 384 Liberty ships and 94 leaner, faster Victory ships were built at Bethlehem Steel’s Fairfield shipyard, which made more vessels than any U.S. shipyard. By late 1943, the shipyard employed some 46,700 workers, including 6,000 African Americans, who worked around the clock, according to The Baltimore Sun.” Many of the maritime and steel workers lived in Brooklyn.

Brooklyn is an ethnically diverse neighborhood, with mostly low-income and lower middle class residents. Due to the close proximity of Cherry Hill and general neglect from the city of Baltimore, there has been an increase of crime and drug trafficking in the area, spreading out to Fairhaven Avenue and into the neighborhood of Curtis Bay. These are the same problems as most other low income neighborhoods in the city. Increased police presence and video cameras in the last few years have helped curb some crime, with a somewhat positive effect on the community.

Masonville Cove Environmental Education Center
For many years, Brooklyn has been divided from the Patapsco River waterfront by major roadways like the Harbor Tunnel Throughway and Frankfurst Avenue.  This has meant that residents, living just blocks away from the water, were unable to regularly experience this important natural resource.

In 2008, the State of Maryland broke ground on the Masonville Cove Environmental Education Center, which was created to provide environmental educational programs for the Brooklyn community.  Part of a $153 million restoration effort for the cove, which included bike trails, environmental restoration, and the creation of new habitat, the Education Center was designed to be a focal point for school programs and community efforts.  Design/Built by Baltimore Green Construction, the center is a "Near-Zero Net Energy Building", designed to consume 75% less energy than a standard commercial building of its size.  The center was opened by Lt. Governor Anthony Brown on Earth Day of 2009, and is now open for educational programs.

Area projects and developments
 Hargrove District Court House
 3700 Potee St is up for development by the Baltimore Development Corporation (BDC)
 Fairfield Industrial Park (Fairfield is east of Brooklyn) is scheduled for redevelopment.
 Gateway South is progressing, and right around the corner from Brooklyn.

See also
Brooklyn Park, Maryland

References

External links

Neighborhoods in Baltimore
Poverty in Maryland
South Baltimore
Working-class culture in Baltimore